Togo competed at the 2019 African Games held from 19 to 31 August 2019 in Rabat, Morocco. In total, two bronze medals were won, both in fencing, and the country finished 38th in the medal table, shared with Benin and Guinea.

Medal summary

Medal table 

|  style="text-align:left; width:78%; vertical-align:top;"|

|  style="text-align:left; width:22%; vertical-align:top;"|

Athletics 

Fabrice Dabla competed in the men's 100 metres and men's 200 metres events. He reached the semifinals in the men's 100 metres event and he did not finish in the heats in the men's 200 metres event.

Juliette Bouley competed in the women's 100 metres and women's 200 metres events. In both events she did not advance to compete in the semifinals.

Judith Koumedzina also competed in the women's 100 metres event and she also did not advance to the semifinals.

Fayza Issaka competed in the women's long jump event. She finished in 10th place.

Prenam Pesse and Lazare Simklina also competed in athletics.

Boxing 

Anani Hounkpatin (men's 57 kg) and John Koudeha (men's 75 kg) competed in boxing.

Fencing 

Rebecca Adamenou, Charlene Anadi and Francoise Koutoglo competed in fencing. They won the bronze medal in the women's foil team event and the women's sabre team event.

Judo 

Two athletes represented Togo in judo.

Rowing 

Three athletes competed in rowing: Michel Agbassah, Bonay Agounke and Akoko Komlanvi.

Swimming 

Two swimmers represented Togo in swimming: Emeric Kpegba and Mawupemon Otogbe.

Table tennis 

Togo competed in table tennis.

Taekwondo 

Two athletes competed in Taekwondo.

Tennis 

Bernard Alipoe-Tchotchodji and Charles Alipoe-Tchotchodji competed in tennis in the men's singles and men's doubles events.

In the men's singles event Bernard did not advance to the next round and Charles advanced to the next round where he was eliminated by Takanyi Garanganga.

In the men's doubles event they advanced to the next round where they were eliminated by Adam Moundir and Lamine Ouahab.

References 

Nations at the 2019 African Games
2019
African Games